Riadh Ben Khedher (born 26 September 1976) is a Tunisian rower. He competed in the men's single sculls event at the 2000 Summer Olympics.

References

1976 births
Living people
Tunisian male rowers
Olympic rowers of Tunisia
Rowers at the 2000 Summer Olympics
Place of birth missing (living people)